Danah Zohar (born 1945) is an American-British author and speaker on physics, philosophy, complexity and management.

Life and work 
Zohar studied Physics and Philosophy at MIT and did postgraduate work in Philosophy, Religion & Psychology at Harvard University. She is Visiting Professor in the College of Management at Guizhou University in China. She was included in the 2002 Financial Times Prentice Hall book Business Minds as one of "the world's greatest management thinkers".

She proposed spiritual intelligence as an aspect of intelligence that sits above the traditional measure of IQ and the various notions of emotional intelligence, at the conscious level of meaning and purpose, and that is derived from the properties of a living complex adaptive system. She advocates quantum physics as a guiding metaphor for personal psychology and corporate and social organisation, in contrast with the deterministic Newtonian mechanics and machine metaphor found in the scientific management of Frederick Winslow Taylor and other early management thinkers.

Selected publications 
Zohar is author (or co-author with her late husband, the psychiatrist Ian Marshall) of the following books:

References

External links 

 Danah Zohar at bloomsbury.com

1945 births
Living people
American business writers
Women business writers
Harvard University alumni
Massachusetts Institute of Technology alumni
Academics of Oxford Brookes University
Date of birth missing (living people)
Place of birth missing (living people)